Ahar Meshkin (also Romanized as Āhār Meshkīn; also known as Āhār Meshgīn, Ahār Namkīn, Armshakan, and Armushkun) is a village in Khararud Rural District, in the Central District of Khodabandeh County, Zanjan Province, Iran. At the 2006 census, its population was 1,010, in 217 families.

References 

Populated places in Khodabandeh County